The Hinckley School (formerly John Cleveland College) is a coeducational secondary school located in Hinckley, Leicestershire, England. The school also includes the John Cleveland Sixth Form Centre.

Whilst also Exceeding Expectations within the Science Department with achieving a 'Specialist Science College' Title. This was the first school within the area to receive it, followed by Mount Grace High School. There are currently around 1750 students and 250 teachers and staff.

History 
Hinckley Grammar School was first mentioned in the parish records of 1629, though it was certainly in existence before this time. It was on Castle Road at the centre of Hinckley. However, in 1791 it was noted by the Universal British Directory that "The old town hall and school house remain, but are ruinous". In 1831 it was noted by the same organisation as "In a very dilapidated state", and the old grammar school was pulled down 21 years later in 1852, eventually being replaced by houses and shops. In 1877 a new school was opened, which in 1891 had 50 pupils. In 1894 moved to new purpose built premises on Leicester Road, close to the current site. In 1901 the school admitted girls. In 1963 the grammar school moved to Butt Lane and the Leicester Road buildings were taken over by Mount Grace High School.

The school attained specialist Science College status, before converting to academy status in 2012. Previously an upper school for pupils aged 14 to 18, in September 2015 this expanded to include 11-year-olds and was renamed from John Cleveland College to Hinckley Academy.

In 2013, headmaster Ryan Hunt pledged the school would be plastic free by 2024.

Facilities 
The school campus includes a main hall, a swimming pool, a large canteen, a lecture theatre, a sports hall, a gym, astro turf pitches, a hospitality block, a media room, tennis courts, football pitches, rugby pitches, land athletics pitches and tracks, store rooms and a library (the Learning Resource Centre). During May–September 2010, phase 1 of the sports centre refurbishment took place; this consisted of changing facilities. During December 2010 work started on phase 2 to add upper changing facilities and swimming pool. The new facilities opened March 2011. During August 2011 the design technology foyer and washrooms received a complete re-design and refurbishment.

Awards
Awards include Investors in People, Artsmark Gold, International Schools Award and Healthy Schools Award status.

Sport 
The school runs football, rugby, basketball, hockey and kabbadi teams.

Notable former pupils

John Cleveland College
 Leicester Tigers and England rugby union footballers: Barry Evans; Graham Rowntree; Dean Richards; Ollie Smith; Sam Vesty; Manu Tuilagi; Sam Harrison
 Josh Ginnelly
 David Eaton, British gymnast
 Jeremy Usbourne (musician)

Hinckley Grammar School (pre-1974)
 Roger Clark MBE, rally driver
 John Cleveland, poet
 Dill Faulkes, businessman and philanthropist 
 John F. Smith, musician
 Terry St Clair, musician
 Peter Tom CBE, Chief Executive from 1997 to 2005 of Aggregate Industries, and former rugby union player
 Philip Turner, author

References

Educational institutions established in the 1620s
Educational institutions established in 1877
Educational institutions established in the 1960s
Educational institutions established in 1974
Academies in Leicestershire
Secondary schools in Leicestershire
Hinckley
1877 establishments in England